Robyn Urback is a Canadian journalist and political commentator. She is known for her work at the National Post,  and as of 2020 writes an opinion column for The Globe and Mail.

Early life and education
Urback attended Vaughan Road Academy in Toronto.  While studying journalism at Ryerson University, she was presented with 2008 Rolf Lockwood Scholarship for Excellence in Business Magazine feature writing.

Career
By 2010, Urback was contributing opinion articles to Maclean's Magazine, at first concentrating on student issues.

Urback later began to contribute articles and commentary to major news outlets about a variety of topics, including women's issues, 
 crime, local interest topics, politics and world affairs.

By 2013 her work was being published regularly in the National Post.

In 2016 Urback was hired as an opinion columnist and opinion section producer for the Canadian Broadcasting Corporation. Her last day there was 22 October 2019.

She has been working for The Globe and Mail since late 2019.

References

Canadian newspaper journalists
Canadian women journalists
Journalists from Toronto
National Post people
Writers from Toronto
Canadian Broadcasting Corporation people
Toronto Metropolitan University alumni
Maclean's writers and editors
Canadian women non-fiction writers
Canadian women columnists
Living people
Year of birth missing (living people)